Yunyang District, formerly Yun County or Yunxian, is a district of the prefecture-level city of Shiyan in northwestern Hubei Province, China. It borders the provinces of Henan (to the northeast) and Shaanxi (to the north and west). The district spans an area of 3,863 square kilometers, and has a population of 558,355 as of 2010.

In 1992 crania of a species of Homo were found, dated to 900,000 years ago, and showing features of both Homo erectus and Homo sapiens.

Geography 
Approximately 60% of the district is forested.

Climate

Administrative divisions
The district administers 16 towns, 3 townships, and 1 township-level forestry area.

The district also administers the Hongyanbei Forestry Area, which operates as a township-level division.

Economy 
As of 2016, there were 461,100 people living in agrarian households throughout the district. The district is home to 663 agricultural businesses, including 183 agricultural co-operatives. Cultivated land in the district totaled 611,500 mu as of 2016. 96.4% of the district's agricultural production is crop farming, with forestry, animal husbandry, aquaculture, and agricultural services comprising the remaining 3.6%. The living conditions of the district's agrarian population varies greatly, and substandard living conditions are not uncommon. 21.3% of the district's agrarian population lives in bamboo structures, 44.4% of the district's agrarian population does not source their water from protected sources, 90.8% of agrarian households report frequently using firewood for energy needs, 87.4% of the agrarian population does not have access to flush toilets, and the majority of agrarian households do not have access to air conditioning or computers.

100% of the district's villages have access to electricity and landlines, 90.7% have cable TV installed, and 88.4% have access to broadband.

Transportation 
The Xiangyang–Chongqing railway passes through the district.

References

County-level divisions of Hubei
Shiyan